Events in the year 2012 in Croatia.

Incumbents
President – Ivo Josipović
Prime Minister – Zoran Milanović

Events
 January 22 – 2012 Croatian European Union membership referendum
 November 14 – Economy minister Radimir Čačić sentenced to 22 months in prison by a Hungarian court for causing a traffic accident involving two fatalities.
 November 16 – Croatian generals Ante Gotovina and Mladen Markač are acquitted by the International Criminal Tribunal for the former Yugoslavia.
 November 20 – Former Croatian Prime Minister Ivo Sanader is sentenced to 10 years in prison on bribe-taking.

Deaths
 February 13 – Zlatko Crnković, actor (born 1936)
 February 27 – Helga Vlahović, television personality (born 1945)
 July 23 – Mirjana Gross, historian (born 1922)
 August 7 – Veljko Rogošić, swimmer (born 1941)
 August 14 – Maja Bošković-Stulli, historian (born 1922)
 August 25 – Vesna Girardi-Jurkić, archeologist and politician (born 1944)
 September 30 – Boris Šprem, politician (born 1956)
 October 26 – Joža Horvat, writer (born 1915)
 November 20 – Ivan Kušan, children's writer (born 1933)

See also
2012 in Croatian television

References

 
Croatia
Years of the 21st century in Croatia
2010s in Croatia
Croatia